Bahri Messaoud (born ) is a Tunisian male volleyball player. He is part of the Tunisia men's national volleyball team. On club level he plays for C.S.Sfaxien.

References

External links
 profile at FIVB.org

1991 births
Living people
Tunisian men's volleyball players
Place of birth missing (living people)